Vismia jefensis is a species of flowering plant in the Hypericaceae family. It is found only in Panama. It is threatened by habitat loss.

References

Endemic flora of Panama
Endangered plants
jefensis
Taxonomy articles created by Polbot